Antoine Thompson (born October 3, 1987) is a former arena football player for the Iowa Barnstormers.

References

Iowa Barnstormers profile

1987 births
Living people
Nevada Wolf Pack football players
Iowa Barnstormers players
American football defensive backs